House of Hrvatinić was a Bosnian medieval noble family that emerged in Donji Kraji county, located in today's territory of western Bosnia and Herzegovina. Principally they were vassals to Kotromanić dynasty of the Banate of Bosnia and Kingdom of Bosnia, occasionally also to the Kingdom of Hungary, changing loyalties between Hungarian kings Ladislaus of Naples and Sigismund of Luxembourg, and finally the Ottoman Empire (1472–1476). They rose to prominence in the second half of the 14th century, and attained its peak under magnate Hrvoje Vukčić Hrvatinić (1350–1416), who also held large swaths of Dalmatia and obtained title of Grand Duke of Bosnia in 1380. 

Its eponymous founder was Hrvatin Stjepanić ( 1299–1304), a count and holder of possession in parts of "Donji Kraji" and "Zapadne Strane", and a vassal of Croatian magnate Paul I Šubić of Bribir. Hrvatin's sons was part of a coalition of Bosnian and Slavonian nobility that revolted against Mladen II Šubić of Bribir between 1316 and 1317. From around 1322 the family submitted to the Kotromanić dynasty of the Banate of Bosnia. In 1363, the Hrvatinić supported Tvrtko I of Bosnia against Hungary, after which they came up through the ranks in Bosnia, while their most prominent member, Hrvoje Vukčić, along with major new possessions in Donji Kraji and Zapadne Strane was awarded with the title Grand Duke of Bosnia. In c. 1387, while loyal to Tvrtko I, they supported rebellion in Dalmatia against Sigismund. The last member of the family was Matija Vojsalić who was last mentioned in the archives of Republic of Ragusa in 1476. He was installed as a puppet king of Bosnia by the Ottoman sultan as an answer to Nicholas of Ilok, named king of Bosnia by Matthias Corvinus. Matija Vojsalić was removed after conspiring with Matthias Corvinus against the Ottomans and was not mentioned after that.

Lineage

Stjepan or Stipan (died before 1301), according to F. Šišić possibly knez in Donji Kraji, possibly as early as 1244.
Hrvatin Stjepanić (1299–1304), knez (count) in Donji Kraji of Bosnia (de inferioribus Bosne confinibus) and vassal of Paul I Šubić of Bribir. Believed by F. Šišić to have died around the same time as Paul I (1312). He had three sons. Called Hrvatin Stjepanić or Hrvatin Stipanić in historiography.
Vukoslav Hrvatinić (fl. 1315–1326), issued a charter in 1315 in Sanica. In ca. 1326, Ban Stjepan II in a land grant mentioned that Vukoslav "had left the Croatian lord". Served as Knyaz of Ključ (fl. 1325). Married Jelena, the daughter of Knyaz Kurjak.
Vlatko (fl. 1364)
Pavao Hrvatinić (fl. 1323–1332)
Grgur (fl. 1357)
Vladislav (fl. 1357)
Vukac Hrvatinić (fl. 1357–1366), defended the Soko fortress in the Pliva county in ca. 1363 against the Hungarians, for which he was awarded an entire župa Pliva and a title of vojvoda by Ban Tvrtko I.
Hrvoje Vukčić Hrvatinić (1350–1416), Grand Duke of Bosnia (1380), Knyaz of Donji Kraji and Duke of Split (1403) His sister Resa Vukčić princess of Split was married to Knyaz Batalo Šantić.
Vuk Vukčić Hrvatinić
Katarina Vuković Hrvatinić
Jelena Vuković Hrvatinić
Vojislav Vukčić Hrvatinić 
Juraj Vojsalić
Petar Vojsalić
Matija Vojsalić
Dragiša Vukčić Hrvatinić 
Ivaniša Dragišić
Pavao Dragišić
Marko Dragišić
Juraj Dragišić

See also 
 Grand Duke of Bosnia

References

Sources

External links
Hrvatinići - Enciklopedija.hr
Hrvatinići - Leksikografski zavod Miroslav Krleža

Bosnian noble families